The 2016 Asian Men's Club Volleyball Championship was the 17th staging of the AVC Club Championships. The tournament was held in Naypyidaw, Myanmar from 23 to 31 August 2016. The champions qualified for the 2017 Club World Championship as Asia's representative.

Pools composition
Teams were seeded in the first two positions of each pool following the Serpentine system according to their final standing of the 2015 edition. AVC reserved the right to seed the hosts as head of pool A regardless of the final standing of the 2015 edition. All teams not seeded were drawn. But, Turkmenistan later withdrew. Final standing of the 2015 edition are shown in brackets except the hosts who did not participate in the 2015 edition.

Venues
 Wunna Theikdi Sports Complex – Hall B, Naypyidaw, Myanmar – Preliminary round, Pool E, F and Final eight
 Wunna Theikdi Sports Complex – Hall C, Naypyidaw, Myanmar – Preliminary round, Pool H,  9th–12th places and 13th–14th places

Pool standing procedure
 Number of matches won
 Match points
 Sets ratio
 Points ratio
 Result of the last match between the tied teams

Match won 3–0 or 3–1: 3 match points for the winner, 0 match points for the loser
Match won 3–2: 2 match points for the winner, 1 match point for the loser

Preliminary round
All times are Myanmar Standard Time (UTC+06:30).

Pool A

|}

|}

Pool B

|}

|}

Pool C

|}

|}

Pool D

|}

|}

Classification round
All times are Myanmar Standard Time (UTC+06:30).
The results and the points of the matches between the same teams that were already played during the preliminary round shall be taken into account for the classification round.

Pool E

|}

|}

Pool F

|}

|}

Pool H

|}

|}

Final round
All times are Myanmar Standard Time (UTC+06:30).

13th–14th places

13th place match

|}

9th–12th places
After the August 2016 Myanmar earthquake,  Al Jazira decided to give up the 9th–12th places.

9th–12th semifinals

|}

9th place match

|}

Final eight

Quarterfinals

|}

5th–8th semifinals

|}

Semifinals

|}

7th place match

|}

5th place match

|}

3rd place match

|}

Final

|}

Final standing

Awards

Most Valuable Player
 Shahram Mahmoudi (Sarmayeh Bank Tehran)
Best Setter
 Mehdi Mahdavi (Sarmayeh Bank Tehran)
Best Outside Spikers
 Uroš Kovačević (Al Arabi)
 Milad Ebadipour (Sarmayeh Bank Tehran)

Best Middle Blockers
 Leandro Vissotto (Al Arabi)
 Mohammad Mousavi (Sarmayeh Bank Tehran)
Best Opposite Spiker
 György Grozer (Shanghai Golden Age)
Best Libero
 Koichiro Koga (Toyoda Gosei Trefuerza)

External links
Official website
Squads

Asian Men's Club Volleyball Championship